David Rabinovitz (May 22, 1908 – August 25, 1986) was briefly a United States district judge of the United States District Court for the Western District of Wisconsin and was one of the handful of federal judges to be unsuccessfully appointed to the federal bench through a recess appointment.

Education and career

Born in Sheboygan, Wisconsin, Rabinovitz graduated from Marquette University in 1927 and received a Bachelor of Laws from the University of Wisconsin Law School in 1930. He was in private practice in Sheboygan from 1930 to 1964. Rabinovitz was involved with the Democratic Party. He was a labor attorney who  represented the United Auto Workers Local 83 against the Kohler Company  during the strike in the early 1960s.

Federal judicial service
President John F. Kennedy nominated Rabinovitz in 1963 to serve as a Federal Judge in western Wisconsin, but which nomination was opposed by the American Bar Association. On January 7, 1964, Rabinovitz received a recess appointment from President Lyndon B. Johnson to a seat on the United States District Court for the Western District of Wisconsin vacated by Judge Patrick Thomas Stone. Rabinovitz was formally nominated on February 3, 1964, but his service was terminated on October 3, 1964, after his nomination was not confirmed by the United States Senate. He then returned to private practice in Sheboygan until his death in that city on August 25, 1986.

References

Sources
 

1908 births
1986 deaths
People from Sheboygan, Wisconsin
Wisconsin lawyers
Wisconsin Democrats
Judges of the United States District Court for the Western District of Wisconsin
Unsuccessful recess appointments to United States federal courts
United States district court judges appointed by Lyndon B. Johnson
20th-century American judges
Marquette University alumni
University of Wisconsin Law School alumni
20th-century American lawyers